|}
{| class="collapsible collapsed" cellpadding="0" cellspacing="0" style="clear:right; float:right; text-align:center; font-weight:bold;" width="280px"
! colspan="3" style="border:1px solid black; background-color: #77DD77;" | Also Ran

The 1997 Epsom Derby was a horse race which took place at Epsom Downs on Saturday 7 June 1997. It was the 218th running of the Derby, and it was won by Benny the Dip. The winner was ridden by Willie Ryan and trained by John Gosden. The pre-race favourite Entrepreneur finished fourth.

Race details
 Sponsor: Vodafone
 Winner's prize money: £595,250
 Going: Good
 Number of runners: 13
 Winner's time: 2m 35.77s

Full result

* The distances between the horses are shown in lengths or shorter. shd = short-head.† Trainers are based in Great Britain unless indicated.

Winner's details

Further details of the winner, Benny the Dip:

 Foaled: March 25, 1994, in Kentucky, USA
 Sire: Silver Hawk; Dam: Rascal Rascal (Ack Ack)
 Owner: Landon Knight and Claiborne Farm
 Breeder: Landon Knight
 Rating in 1997 International Classifications: 126

Form analysis

Two-year-old races
Notable runs by the future Derby participants as two-year-olds in 1996.

 Benny the Dip – 1st Royal Lodge Stakes, 3rd Racing Post Trophy
 Silver Patriarch – 1st Zetland Stakes
 Fahris – 2nd Silver Tankard Stakes
 Symonds Inn – 2nd Acomb Stakes, 3rd Silver Tankard Stakes
 Papua – 5th Racing Post Trophy

The road to Epsom
Early-season appearances in 1997 and trial races prior to running in the Derby.

 Benny the Dip – 2nd Sandown Classic Trial, 1st Dante Stakes
 Silver Patriarch – 3rd Sandown Classic Trial, 1st Lingfield Derby Trial
 Romanov – 3rd Irish 2,000 Guineas
 Entrepreneur – 1st 2,000 Guineas
 Fahris – 1st Feilden Stakes
 Symonds Inn – 1st Glasgow Stakes
 Mulsalsal – 3rd Dante Stakes
 Cloudings – 1st Prix de Courcelles, 1st Prix Lupin
 Single Empire – 1st Derby Italiano
 Crystal Hearted – 5th Easter Stakes, 1st Dee Stakes
 Papua – 3rd Easter Stakes, 2nd Blue Riband Trial Stakes, 4th Lingfield Derby Trial

Subsequent Group 1 wins
Group 1 / Grade I victories after running in the Derby.

 Silver Patriarch – St. Leger (1997), Coronation Cup (1998), Gran Premio del Jockey Club (1998)
 Single Empire – San Juan Capistrano Invitational Handicap (1999)

Subsequent breeding careers
Leading progeny of participants in the 1997 Epsom Derby.

Sires of Classic winners
Entrepreneur (4th) - Shuttled to New Zealand, exported to Japan, exported to Russia
 Vintage Tipple - 1st Irish Oaks (2003)
 Damson - 1st Phoenix Stakes (2004)
 Berenson - 2nd National Stakes (2004)
 Marie Vision - Dam of The Grey Gatsby

Sires of National Hunt horses
Cloudings (10th)
 Many Clouds - 1st Grand National (2015)
 Cloudy Dream - 1st Future Champion Novices' Chase (2017)
 Cloudy Lane - 1st Peter Marsh Chase (2009)
 Cloudy Too - 1st Peter Marsh Chase (2016)
Silver Patriarch (2nd)
 Silver By Nature - 1st Grand National Trial (2010, 2011)
 Carrickboy - 1st Byrne Group Plate (2013)
 Kentford Grey Lady - 3rd Cleeve Hurdle (2013)
 Rimsky - 1st Persian War Novices' Hurdle (2005)
Benny The Dip (1st) - Exported to America before standing in England
 Benny Be Good - 2nd "Fixed Brush" Handicap Hurdle (2011)
 Unleash - 2nd Martell Cognac Beefeater Restaurants Handicap Hurdle (2004)

Other Stallions
Romanov (3rd) - Exported to America - Exported to ArgentinaFahris (6th) - Fahrisee (three time jumps winner)Musalsal (8th) - Exported to CyprusBold Demand (9th) - Exported to Saudi ArabiaSingle Empire (11th) - Exported to Italy

References

External links
 Colour Chart – Derby 1997

Epsom Derby
 1997
Epsom Derby
Epsom Derby
20th century in Surrey